Swertia is a genus in the gentian family containing plants sometimes referred to as the felworts. Some species bear very showy purple and blue flowers. Many members of this genus have medicinal and cultural purposes.

Plants of genus Frasera are sometimes considered part of this genus, sometimes as a separate genus, and sometimes as synonymous.

Selected species
Species in the genus Swertia include, but are not limited to:

 Swertia angustifolia Buch.-Ham. ex D. Don
 Swertia bimaculata (Siebold & Zucc.) C. B. Clarke
 Swertia bimaculata (Siebold & Zucc.) Hook. f. & Thoms.
 Swertia calcicola Kerr.
 Swertia chinensis (Griseb.) Franch.
 Swertia diluta (Turcz.) Benth. & Hook. f.
 Swertia chirayita (Roxb. ex Fleming) H. Karst.
 Swertia chirata (Wall.) C. B. Clarke
 Swertia ciliata (D. Don ex G. Don) B. L. Burtt.
 Swertia cordata (Wall. ex G. Don) C.B. Clarke
 Swertia dilatata C. B. Clarke
 Swertia hookeri C. B. Clarke
 Swertia japonica (Roem. & Schult.) (Makino) (known by the common names Japanese felwort and Japanese star swertia.)
 Swertia leduci Franch.
 Swertia mileensis T. N. Ho & W. L. Shih
 Swertia macrosperma C. B. Clarke
 Swertia multicaulis D. Don
 Swertia nervosa (G. Don) C. B. Clarke
 Swertia perennis L.
 Swertia punicea Hemsl.
 Swertia purpurascens (D. Don) A. Wall ex E. D. Clarke
 Swertia striata Collett & Hemsl.
 Swertia tibetica Batal.
 Swertia tongluensis Burkill

Chemical constituents
Swertia contains the chemicals sawertiamarine, mangeferin and amarogenitine 1,5,8-trihydroxy-3-methoxyxanthone, 1-hydroxy-2,3,5,7-tetramethoxyxanthone, 1-hydroxy-3,5,8-trimethoxyxanthone, 1-hydroxyl-2,3,4,6-tetramethoxyxanthone, 1-hydroxy-2,3,4,7-tetramethoxyxanthone, 1,8-dihydroxy-3,5-dimethoxyxanthone, 1,7-dihydroxy-3,8-dimethoxyxanthone, 1,3,5,8-tetrahydroxyxanthone, balanophonin, oleanolic acid, maslinic acid, and sumaresinolic acid. Swerilactones from Swertia mileensis showed anti-hepatitis B virus activity in vitro.

Traditional medicine
Swertia is used in Indian Ayurvedic Herbal System to cure Fever as in Laghu sudarshana churna, Maha sudarshan Churna and in Tibetan folk medicine. It is also one of the most widely used medicinal plants of Sikkim, and is considered Vulnerable based on IUCN CAMP Criteria.

References

External links

 Jepson Manual Treatment
 Picture of Swertia perennis

Swertia
Gentianaceae genera
Flora of Nepal
Flora of North America